George Faucett Pitts Abbott, GC (18 September 1897 – 10 June 1977) was a British sailor and a recipient of the Albert Medal, later exchanged for the George Cross.

Early life
Abbott was born in Nelson, Lancashire, educated at Whitefield School, and was working in a textile factory on the outbreak of the First World War, eventually enlisting into the Royal Naval Reserve (Trawler Section)  in August 1916.

Albert Medal
On 14 December 1917, dated 12 December 1917, Abbott was gazetted for his actions on 14 September 1917. His citation read:

Abbott was presented with his medal by the King at Buckingham Palace on 16 February 1918.

Post-war life
After the war Abbot moved to Coventry, and during the Second World War worked in a munitions factory. He married Alice Emily Harris in 1946, and had a daughter. He ran a fish and chip shop in Northfleet, Kent, before moving back to Nelson in 1961 to run a grocery shop. He died in Higham, Lancashire, in 1977.

References

Recipients of the Albert Medal (lifesaving)
1897 births
1977 deaths
People from Nelson, Lancashire
Royal Navy personnel of World War I
Royal Naval Reserve personnel